The 1984 San Marino motorcycle Grand Prix was the final race of the 1984 Grand Prix motorcycle racing season. It took place on 1–2 September 1984 at the Mugello Circuit.

Classification

500 cc

References

San Marino and Rimini Riviera motorcycle Grand Prix
San Marino
San Marino Motorcycle Grand Prix
San Marino Motorcycle Grand Prix